This list of SST Records bands includes several artists who have released music through the California independent record label SST Records.

Artists

Notes

SST